Robin F. Williams (born 1984, Columbus, Ohio) is a contemporary painter based in Brooklyn, New York.

Biography 
She holds a BFA from the Rhode Island School of Design, Providence, Rhode Island.

She has been exhibited at galleries including Bard College at Simon’s Rock, P.P.O.W. Gallery, Grand Central Art Center at CSUF, The Hole NYC, and Sargent’s Daughters. Williams’ exhibition have been noted in publications the New York Magazine and Juxtapoz.

Williams presents women in the  poses of fashion-magazine advertising.

Discussing her work in the New York Times, chief art-critic Roberta Smith asserts, “The paintings are extravagantly in-your-face regarding execution, style, image and social thrust. They take aim at the impossible idealizations of women in both art and advertising, depicting mostly nude and aloof androgynous supermodels, and the occasional feline, with a new kind of cool yet visceral bravura.”

References

External links
Official website

1984 births
Living people
American contemporary painters
Rhode Island School of Design alumni
21st-century American painters
Artists from Columbus, Ohio